The Fiat A.80 was an 18-cylinder, twin-row, air-cooled, radial aircraft engine produced during World War II. Rated at 1,000 hp (745 kW), it was a more powerful development of the 14-cylinder Fiat A.74.

Variants
Fiat A.80 R.C.20With reduction gear and supercharger, rated altitude .
Fiat A.80 R.C.40With reduction gear and supercharger, rated altitude .
Fiat A.80 R.C.41With reduction gear and supercharger, rated altitude .

Applications
 Aeronautica Umbra Trojani AUT.18
 Breda Ba.65 
 CANSA FC.20
 CANT Z.509
 Fiat BR.20 Cicogna 
 Fiat G.18
 Savoia-Marchetti SM.79 Sparviero

Specifications (A.80 R.C.41)

See also

References

 Gunston, Bill. (1986). World Encyclopaedia of Aero Engines. Patrick Stephens: Wellingborough. p. 56
 Ragazzi, Paolo (1938). The Power of Aircraft Engines at Altitude. p. 3

Radial engines
A.80
1930s aircraft piston engines
Aircraft air-cooled radial piston engines